Broening is a surname. Notable people with the surname include:

H. Lyman Broening (1882–1983), American cinematographer
Marius Broening (born 1983), German sprinter
William Frederick Broening (1870–1953), American politician

See also
Browning (name)